George C. Armstrong (July 11, 1872–December 27, 1950) was an American businessman, newspaper editor, and politician.

Armstrong was born in Eldora, Iowa. He went to the Marshalltown High School in Marshalltown, Iowa, business college, and University of Baltimore. Armstrong worked in the oil refinery business. He was also involved in the engraving and real estate businesses. Armstrong lived in Lawrenceville, Illinois and was the editor and publisher of the Lawrenceville Daily Record newspaper. Armstrong served on the Lawrenceville City Council and mayor of Lawrenceville. He was a Republican. He served in the Illinois Senate from 1941 to 1949. He died in Lawrenceville, Illinois from a short illness.

Notes

1872 births
1950 deaths
People from Eldora, Iowa
People from Lawrenceville, Illinois
University of Baltimore alumni
Businesspeople from Illinois
Editors of Illinois newspapers
Mayors of places in Illinois
Illinois city council members
Republican Party Illinois state senators